Sharafabad (also Romanized as Sharafābād; also known as Sharafa) is a village in Sanjabad-e Jonubi Rural District, Firuz District, Kowsar County, Ardabil Province, Iran. At the 2006 census, its population was 40, in 9 families.

References 

Towns and villages in Kowsar County